Joseph Alfred Cooke (28 March 1904 – 14 April 1981) was an Australian politician. Born in Western Australia, he was educated at state schools before becoming a railways officer, rising to become President of the Railway Officers' Union. In 1946, he was elected to the Australian Senate as a Labor Senator for Western Australia. Defeated in 1951, he was re-appointed in 1952 after the death of Labor Senator Richard Nash. He held the seat until his defeat in 1964, when he was demoted to third place on the ballot paper to make way for Western Australian Labor Party Vice-President John Wheeldon. Cooke died in 1981.

References

Australian Labor Party members of the Parliament of Australia
Members of the Australian Senate for Western Australia
Members of the Australian Senate
1904 births
1981 deaths
20th-century Australian politicians